Tilligte is a rural village in the Dutch province of Overijssel. It is a part of the municipality of Dinkelland and is situated about 10 km north of Oldenzaal.

It was first mentioned in 1295 as Tilgede, and means "place where young oaks grow". In 1840, it was home to 463 people.

The windmill in the village is called 'Westerveld Möl'. The church is called 'Simon en Judaskerk'. Another point of interest is the water inlet 't Schuivenhuisje at the Kanaal Almelo-Nordhorn.

Gallery

References 

Populated places in Overijssel
Twente
Dinkelland